Luigi Morciano (born 25 February 1994) is an Italian motorcycle racer. He currently competes in the CIV Supersport Championship aboard a Kawasaki ZX-6R.

Career statistics

Grand Prix motorcycle racing

By season

Races by year
(key)

Supersport World Championship

Races by year
(key)

External links

1994 births
Living people
People from Anzio
Italian motorcycle racers
125cc World Championship riders
Moto3 World Championship riders
Supersport World Championship riders
Sportspeople from the Metropolitan City of Rome Capital